Roland Wetzig (born 24 July 1959 in Oschatz, Saxony) is an East German bob pusher for 17-time gold medal winner Wolfgang Hoppe who competed from the late 1970s to the late 1980s. Competing in two Winter Olympics, he won two medals in the four-man with a gold in 1984 and a bronze in 1980.

Wetzig also won two silver medals in the four-man event at the FIBT World Championships, earning them in 1982 and 1987.

References
 Bobsleigh four-man Olympic medalists for 1924, 1932–56, and since 1964
 Bobsleigh four-man world championship medalists since 1930
 Kluge, Volker (2000). Das große Lexikon der DDR-Sportler. Berlin: Schwarzkopf & Schwarzkopf. 

1959 births
Living people
German male bobsledders
Bobsledders at the 1980 Winter Olympics
Bobsledders at the 1984 Winter Olympics
Olympic bobsledders of East Germany
Olympic gold medalists for East Germany
Olympic bronze medalists for East Germany
Olympic medalists in bobsleigh
National People's Army military athletes
Medalists at the 1984 Winter Olympics
Medalists at the 1980 Winter Olympics
People from Oschatz
Sportspeople from Saxony